Siddiquir Rahman is a Bangladesh Nationalist Party politician and the former Member of Parliament of Dhaka-7.

Career
Rahman was elected to parliament from Dhaka-7 as a Bangladesh Nationalist Party candidate in 1979.

References

Bangladesh Nationalist Party politicians
2nd Jatiya Sangsad members
Year of birth missing (living people)
People from Munshiganj District
Living people